This is a list of awards and nominations received by American country music trio Lady A. Since winning the Country Music Association Awards New Artist of the Year award in 2008, the group have accumulated seven more awards, including their first Grammy Award in 2010 for Best Country Performance by Duo or Group with Vocals. At the 2009 CMAs, the group ended Rascal Flatts' six-year reign as Vocal Group of the Year. At the 2010 CMAs, they became the first artist in CMA Award history to receive the Single of the Year honor for two consecutive years.

Academy of Country Music Awards
The Academy of Country Music Awards is an annual country music awards show, the first ever created, established in 1964. Lady A has won 14 ACM Awards out of 25 nominations.

American Country Awards
The American Country Awards is a country music awards show, entirely voted on by fans. Created by Fox in 2010, the awards honor country music artists in music, video, and touring categories. Lady A has won nine awards out of 18 nominations

American Music Awards
The American Music Awards is an annual awards ceremony created by Dick Clark in 1973. Lady A has won four AMA's out of ten nominations.

Billboard Music Awards
The Billboard Music Award is an honor given by Billboard, the preeminent publication covering the music business. Finalists are based on United States year-end chart performance according to Nielsen data for sales, number of downloads and total airplay. They have won six awards out of 11 nominations.

British Country Music Association Awards
They have won one award out of two nominations.

CMT Music Awards
The CMT Music Awards is an annual fan-voted video music awards show that was established in 2002 by CMT, dedicated exclusively to honor country music videos. They won 16 awards out of 23 nominations.

Country Music Association Awards
The Country Music Association Awards is an annual country music awards show, established in 1967. They have won six CMA's out of 26 nominations.

Grammy Awards
The Grammy Awards are presented annually by the National Academy of Recording Arts and Sciences for outstanding achievements in the music industry. It was established in 1959. Lady A has won seven Grammys out of 14 nominations.

People's Choice Awards
The People's Choice Awards is an annual American award show recognizing the people and the work of popular culture. The show was established in 1975, recognizing the people and work in popular culture, voted on by the general public. They have won two awards out of six nominations.

Teen Choice Awards
The Teen Choice Awards is an annual award show that honors the year's biggest achievements in movies, music, television, sports, fashion and more voted by teens. The show was established in 1999. Lady A has won six awards out of ten nominations.

Tony Awards
The Antoinette Perry Award for Excellence in Theatre, more commonly known informally as the Tony Award, recognizes achievement in live Broadway theatre. The awards are presented by the American Theatre Wing and The Broadway League at an annual ceremony in New York City. They have been nominated for one Tony Award.

Other awards

References

Awards
Lists of awards received by American musician
Lists of awards received by musical group